Vishnevsky (masculine) or Vishnevskaya (feminine) is the Russian surname of the Polish equivalent Wiśniewski, see the latter article for other variants of the surname. Notable people with the surname include:

Aleksandr Leonidovich Vishnevsky (1861–1943), Russian/Soviet actor
Alexander Alexandrovich Vishnevsky (1906–1975), Soviet physician
Aleksandr Sergeevič Višnevskij, Soviet and Russian speleologist
Alexander Vasilyevich Vishnevsky, Soviet physician
Anatoly Vishnevsky, Russian demographer and sociologist
Galina Vishnevskaya (1926–2012), Russian opera singer
Ivan Vishnenskiy (born 1988), Russian hockey player
Ivan Vishnevsky (1957–1996), Soviet footballer
Sergey Vishnevsky, Russian painter
Vikenty Vishnevsky, Polish/Russian astronomer
Vitaly Vishnevskiy (born 1980), Russian hockey player
Vladimir Vishnevsky, Russian poet
Vsevolod Vishnevsky (1900–1951), Russian dramatist

Russian-language surnames